Muscarella claviculata is a species of orchid plant native to Ecuador.

References 

Pleurothallidinae
Flora of Ecuador